The sport of football in the country of New Caledonia is run by the Fédération Calédonienne de Football. The association administers the national football team as well as the national league.

League system

New Caledonia football venues

References